Classeya is a genus of moths of the family Crambidae.

Species
Classeya aphrodite Bleszynski, 1964
Classeya argyrodonta (Hampson, 1910)
Classeya bicuspidalis (Hampson, 1919)
Classeya bleszynskii Bassi, 1999
Classeya hexagona T.M. Chen & S.M. Song, 2002
Classeya interstriatellus (Hampson, 1896)
Classeya luteomarginata Bassi, 1999
Classeya medea Bleszynski, 1964
Classeya niveifascialis (Hampson, 1896)
Classeya placydioni Bleszynski, 1960
Classeya preissneri Bleszynski, 1964
Classeya quadricuspis (Hampson, 1919)
Classeya symetrica Bassi, 1999
Classeya trichelites (Meyrick, 1936)

References

 , 1999: Contributo allo studio delle Crambinae: X. Nuove specie africane (Lepidoptera: Pyraloidea, Crambinae). Shilap. Revista de Lepidopterologia 27 (105): 57–67.
 , 2002: A taxonomic study on the Chinese species of the genus Classeya Bleszynski (Lepidoptera: Pyralidae: Crambinae). Acta Zootaxonomica Sinica 27 (3): 572–575.

Crambinae
Crambidae genera
Taxa named by Stanisław Błeszyński